Water politics, sometimes called hydropolitics, is politics affected by the availability of water and water resources, a necessity for all life forms and human development.

Arun P. Elhance's definition of hydropolitics is "the systematic study of conflict and cooperation between states over water resources that transcend international borders".
Mollinga, P. P. classifies water politics into four categories, "the everyday politics of water resources management", "the politics of water policy in the context of sovereign states", "inter-state hydropolitics" and "the global politics of water". The availability of drinking water per capita is inadequate and shrinking worldwide. The causes, related to both quantity and quality, are many and varied; they include local scarcity, limited availability and population pressures, but also human activities of mass consumption, misuse, environmental degradation and water pollution, as well as climate change.

Water is a strategic natural resource, and scarcity of potable water is a frequent contributor to political conflicts throughout the world. With decreasing availability and increasing demand for water, some have predicted that clean water will become the "next oil"; making countries like Canada, Chile, Norway, Colombia and Peru, with this resource in abundance, the water-rich countries in the world. The UN World Water Development Report (WWDR, 2003) from the World Water Assessment Program indicates that, in the next 20 years, the quantity of water available to everyone is predicted to decrease by 30%. Currently, 40% of the world's inhabitants have insufficient fresh water for minimal hygiene. More than 2.2 million people died in 2000 from diseases related to the consumption of contaminated water or drought. In 2004, the UK charity WaterAid reported that a child dies every 15 seconds from easily preventable water-related diseases; often this means lack of sewage disposal; see toilet. The United Nations Development Program sums up world water distribution in the 2006 development report: "One part of the world, sustains a designer bottled water market that generates no tangible health benefits, another part suffers acute public health risks because people have to drink water from drains or from lakes and rivers." Fresh water—now more precious than ever in our history for its extensive use in agriculture, high-tech manufacturing, and energy production—is increasingly receiving attention as a resource requiring better management and sustainable use.

Riparian water rights have become issues of international diplomacy, in addition to domestic and regional water rights and politics. World Bank Vice President Ismail Serageldin predicted, "Many of the wars of the 20th century were about oil, but wars of the 21st century will be over water unless we change the way we manage water." This is debated by some, however, who argue that disputes over water usually are resolved by diplomacy and do not turn into wars. Another new school of thought argues that "perceived fears of losing control over shared water might contribute towards a constant preparedness to go to war among riparian nations, just in case there is one".

Water policy

Water politics concepts

Hydro-hegemony 
The framework of hydro-hegemony was postulated by scholars Mark Zeitoun and Jeroen F. Warner in 2006 as a useful analytical paradigm useful to examine the options of powerful or hegemonized riparians and how they might move away from domination towards cooperation.

Hydro-hegemony refers to "hegemony at the river basin level, achieved through water resource control strategies such as resource capture, integration and containment. The strategies are executed through an array of tactics (e.g. coercion-pressure, treaties, knowledge construction, etc.) that are enabled by the exploitation of existing power asymmetries within a weak international institutional context". The two pillars of hydro-hegemony are riparian position and exploitation potential. The actor who wins control over the resource is determined through the form of hydro-hegemony that is established, in favor of the most powerful actor ('first among equals').

In 2010, Mark Zeitoun and Ana Elisa Cascão modified the framework to constitute of four overarching pillars of power —  geographical power, material power, bargaining power and ideational power. As such, hydro-hegemony can be understood as hegemony at the river basin level that occurs where control over transboundary flows is consolidated by the most powerful actor.

Water as a critical resource 

Most importantly, fresh water is a fundamental requirement of all living organisms, crops, livestock and humanity included. The UNDP considers access to it a basic human right and a prerequisite for peace. The Ex-UN Secretary-General  Kofi Annan stated in 2001, "Access to safe water is a fundamental human need and, therefore, a basic human right. Contaminated water jeopardizes both the physical and social health of all people. It is an affront to human dignity."  With increased development, many industries, including forestry, agriculture, mining, manufacturing and recreation require sizable additional amounts of freshwater to operate.  This, however, has led to increases in air and water pollution, which in turn have reduced the quality of water supply. More sustainable development practices are advantageous and necessary.

According to the WHO, each human being requires a bare minimum of 20 litres of fresh water per day for basic hygiene; this equals 7.3 cubic metres (about 255 ft3) per person, per year. Based on the availability, access and development of water supplies, the specific usage figures vary widely from country to country, with developed nations having existing systems to treat water for human consumption, and deliver it to every home. At the same time however, some nations across Latin America, parts of Asia, South East Asia, Africa and the Middle East either do not have sufficient water resources or have not developed these or the infrastructure to the levels required. This occurs for many varied reasons. It has resulted in conflict and often results in a reduced level or quantity of fresh water per capita consumption; this situation leads toward disease, and at times, to starvation and death.

The source of virtually all freshwater is precipitation from the atmosphere, in the form of mist, rain and snow, as part of the water cycle over eons, millennia and in the present day. Freshwater constitutes only 3% of all water on Earth, and of that, slightly over two thirds is stored frozen in glaciers and polar ice caps. The remaining unfrozen freshwater is mainly found as groundwater, with only a small fraction present in the air, or on the ground surface. Surface water is stored in wetlands or lakes or flows in a stream or river, and is the most commonly utilized resource for water. In places, surface water can be stored in a reservoir behind a dam, and then used for municipal and industrial water supply, for irrigation and to generate power in the form of hydroelectricity. Sub-surface groundwater, although stored in the pore space of soil and rock; it is utilized most as water flowing within aquifers below the water table. Groundwater can exist both as a renewable water system closely associated with surface water and as a separate, deep sub-surface water system in an aquifer. This latter case is sometimes called "fossil water", and is realistically non-renewable. Normally, groundwater is utilized where surface sources are unavailable or when surface supply distribution is limited.

Rivers sometimes flow through several countries and often serve as the boundary or demarcation between them. With these rivers, water supply, allocation, control, and use are of great consequence to survival, quality of life, and economic success. The control of a nation's water resources is considered vital to the survival of a state. Similar cross-border groundwater flow also occurs. Competition for these resources, particularly where limited, have caused or been additive to conflicts in the past.

The highlands of Ethiopia may be considered a water tower region in East Africa. Sovereign control of upland water supply is likely to govern downstream politics for many years.

Contamination from human activity 
Water contamination usually occurs through a series of two mechanisms: point and non-point sources of pollution. According to the U.S. Environmental Protection Agency (EPA), point source pollution is "any single identifiable source of pollution from which pollutants are discharged, such as a pipe, ditch, ship or factory smokestack." Therefore, among the most common examples of point source pollution, poor factory and sewage treatment appear high on the list; although not as frequent, but, nevertheless, equally—if not more—dangerous, oil spills are another famous example of point source of pollution. On the other hand, non-point sources of pollution are those that may come from different sources, among which, poor and badly monitored agricultural activities can negatively affect the quality of any nearby sources of water.

Point sources of pollution 
 Industrial products and wastes: Many harmful chemicals are used widely in local business and industry. These can become drinking water pollutants if not well managed. The most common sources of such problems are:
 Local businesses: Factories, industrial plants, and even small businesses such as gas stations and dry cleaners handle a variety of hazardous chemicals that need careful management. Spills and improper disposal of these chemicals or of industrial wastes can threaten ground water supplies.
 Leaking underground tanks and piping: Petroleum products, chemicals, and wastes stored in underground storage tanks and pipes may end up in the ground water. Tanks and piping leak if they are constructed or installed improperly. Steel tanks and piping corrode with age. Tanks are often found on farms. The possibility of leaking tanks is great on old, abandoned farm sites. Farm tanks are exempt from the EPA rules for petroleum and chemical tanks.
 Landfills and waste dumps: Modern landfills are designed to contain any leaking liquids, but floods can carry conaminants over the barriers. Older dumpsites may have a wide variety of pollutants that can seep into ground water.
 Household wastes: Improper disposal of many common products can pollute ground water. These include cleaning solvents, used motor oil, paints, and paint thinners. Even soaps and detergents can harm drinking water. These are often a problem from faulty septic tanks and septic leaching fields.
 Lead and copper: Elevated concentrations of lead are rarely found in source water. Lead is commonly found in household plumbing materials. Homes built before 1986 are more likely to have lead pipes, fixtures, and solder. Lead can leach into water systems when these plumbing materials corrode. The acidity or alkalinity of water – or of any solution – is expressed as pH, from 0–14. Anything neutral, for example, has a pH of 7. Acids have a pH less than 7, bases (alkaline) greater than 7. pH greatly affects corrosion. Temperature and mineral content also affect how corrosive it is. Lead in drinking water can cause a variety of adverse health effects. Exposure to lead in drinking water can cause delays in physical and mental development in babies and children. Adults who drink this water over many years could develop kidney problems or high blood pressure.
 Water treatment chemicals: Improper handling or storage of water-well treatment chemicals (such as disinfectants or corrosion inhibitors) close to your well can cause problems.

Non-point sources of pollution 
Agricultural activities that cause non-point source pollution include:
 Poorly managed animal feeding operations
 Overgrazing
 Overworking the land (for example, plowing too often)
 Poorly managed and ineffective application of pesticides, irrigation water, and fertilizer.
 Bacteria and nitrates: These contaminants are found in human and animal wastes. Septic tanks or large numbers of farm animals can also cause bacterial and nitrate pollution. Both septic systems and animal manures must be carefully managed to prevent private well contamination.
 Concentrated animal feeding operations: The number of concentrated animal feeding operation, often called "factory farms," is growing. On these farms thousands of animals are raised in a small space. The large amounts of animal wastes/manures from these farms can threaten water supplies. Strict and careful manure management is needed to prevent pathogen and nutrient problems in private wells. Salts from high levels of manures can also pollute ground water.
 Heavy metals: Activities such as mining and construction can release large amounts of heavy metals into nearby ground water sources. Some older fruit orchards may contain high levels of arsenic, once used as a pesticide. At high levels, these metals pose a health risk.
 Fertilizers and pesticides: Farmers use fertilizers and pesticides to promote growth and reduce insect damage. These products are also used on golf courses and suburban lawns and gardens. The chemicals in these products may end up in ground water. The extent of contamination depends on the types and amounts of chemicals used and how they are applied. Local environmental conditions (such as soil types, seasonal snow, and rainfall) also impact their contamination potential. Groundwater will normally look clear and clean because the ground naturally filters out particulate matter. But, natural and human-induced chemicals can be found in groundwater. As groundwater flows through the ground, metals such as iron and manganese are dissolved and may later be found in high concentrations in the water. Industrial discharges, urban activities, agriculture, groundwater pumpage, and disposal of waste all can affect groundwater quality. Contaminants can be human-induced, as from leaking fuel tanks or toxic chemical spills. Pesticides and fertilizers applied to lawns and crops can accumulate and migrate to the water table. Leakage from septic tanks and/or waste-disposal sites also can introduce bacteria to the water, and pesticides and fertilizers that seep into farmed soil can eventually end up in water drawn from a well. Or, a well might have been placed in land that was once used for something like a garbage or chemical dump site. Polluted runoff is created by rainfall or snow-melt moving over and through the ground. As the runoff moves, it picks up and carries away natural and human-made pollutants, finally depositing them into watersheds via lakes, rivers, wetlands, coastal waters, and even our underground sources of drinking water. In 2002, in the National Water Quality Inventory report to U.S. Congress, the states reported that agricultural non-point source (NPS) pollution is the leading cause of river and stream impairment and the second leading cause of impairment in lakes, ponds, and reservoirs.

Water politics by country

OECD countries 

A 2001 University of Victoria report says that since 1980, overall water use in Canada has increased by 25.7%. This is five times faster than the overall OECD increase of 4.5%. In contrast, nine OECD nations were able to decrease their overall water use since 1980 (Sweden, the Netherlands, the United States, the United Kingdom, the Czech Republic, Luxembourg, Poland, Finland and Denmark).

India

India–Bangladesh 
The Ganges is disputed between India and Bangladesh. The water reserves are being quickly depleted and polluted, while the Gangotri glacier that feeds the river is retreating hundreds of feet each year (experts blame climate change) and deforestation in the Himalayas is causing subsoil streams flowing into the Ganges river to dry up. Downstream, India controls the flow to Bangladesh with the Farakka Barrage, 10 kilometers (6 mi) on the Indian side of the border. Until the late 1990s, India used the barrage to divert the river to Calcutta, to keep the city's port from drying up during the dry season. This denied Bangladeshi farmers water and silt, and it left the Sundarban wetlands and mangrove forests at the river's delta seriously threatened. The two countries have now signed an agreement to share the water more equally. Water quality, however, remains a problem, with high levels of arsenic and untreated sewage in the river water.

India–Pakistan 
Recently India starting constructing Kishanganga Dam thus depriving Pakistan of its 33% water coming in Jehlum River. Pakistan is building the same type of dam called Neelum Jehlum Dam. After the Indo Pak Treaty of 1960, Ravi and Sutleg River belong to India while Jehlum, Chenab, Indus belong to Pakistan. But still a growing dissatisfication exist on Pakistani side for sharing its water with India.

Kaveri dispute

Mexico 
Mexico has experienced significant issues in preventing contamination and water pollution and in distributing clean water to households and businesses.  As society has evolved and urbanization, economic growth, and increased trade have occurred, the demand for clean water has increased.  However, pollution associated with economic growth and industrialization combined with the arid climate have restricted access to clean water for many households and firms. The already arid climate is susceptible to droughts with increasing climate change issues, which may further hinder access to water.

Mexico relies on groundwater for their water supply which has led to significant exploitation of aquifers and therefore increased costs in accessing water.  Mexico City is the largest city and urban center with a very high demand for drinking water.  The water supply provided by the "Sistema de Aguas de la Ciudad de Mexico" (SCAMEX) is only 98% effective and has therefore left about 48,000 households in the city alone without water. However, even those with access to the water provided by the city remain unsatisfied.  Even those already connected to SCAMEX experience issues due to water loss and poor water quality. In Mexico City, an estimated 40% of the city's water is lost through leaky pipes built at the turn of the 20th century. According to the results of a 2011 survey, up to 87% of the households in Mexico City would prefer to access water used for cooking and drinking through sources other than the tap.  Alternative ways to access water include: purchasing bottled water or filtration devices, or boiling water before drinking.  The issue is that these alternative measures are typically significantly more expensive than using the water provided.

Middle East 

In the Middle East, water is an important strategic resource and political issue. By 2025, it is predicted that the countries of the Arabian peninsula will be using more than double the amount of water naturally available to them.

Water politics is not an emerging field within international relations discourse, nor is it a force insignificant in comparison to other political pressures, such as those of critical infrastructure (for example, petroleum for the United States), or that of strategic geopolitical control (for example, control of the Suez canal or the Persian Gulf). In the context of the Middle East, with a multitude of existing national, subnational, ideological, ethnic, religious and pan-national tensions, conflicts and associations, water politics has already been considered to have played a major role in tensions between Iraq, Syria and Turkey in 1990, when Turkey commenced the Southeastern Anatolia Project (also known as GAP) to dam sections of the Euphrates and Tigris rivers north of the Syrian/Turkey border. Finding themselves without control of their waterways, Syria and Iraq formed an alliance, ignoring the previous disputes which had divided them, to confront the issue of water control. Iraq and Syria watched with apprehension the construction of the Atatürk Dam in Turkey and a projected system of 22 dams on the Tigris and Euphrates rivers.

Within the Middle East, all major rivers cross at least one international border, with the most important, the Tigris and Euphrates, crossing through three major Middle Eastern nations. This means that the nations, cities and towns downstream from the next are hugely effected by the actions and decisions of other groups they have little practical control over. In particular this is evident with the cutting of water supply from one nation to the next, just as issues of air pollution affect the states surrounding that which is producing the pollution initially. It is believed that up to  50% of water required for any specific state within the Middle East finds its source in another state.

According to the BBC, the list of 'water-scarce' countries in the region grew from three in 1955 to eight in 1990 with another seven expected to be added within 20 years, including three Nile nations (the Nile is shared by nine countries). According to former Egyptian President Hosni Mubarak, the only conceivable flashpoint Egypt may encounter in the 21st century is the control of fresh water resources. With substantial, but falling rates of fertility, the issue of water distribution in the Middle East will not be easily dismissed.

A recent report "Water Cooperation for a Secure World" published by Strategic Foresight Group shows that active water cooperation between countries sharing trans-boundary water resources is directly correlated with security and peace of nations involved. Conversely, absence of active water cooperation is directly correlated with risk of war between countries sharing trans-boundary water resources. This conclusion is reached after examining trans-boundary water relations in over 200 shared river basins in 148 countries. Countries in the Middle East face the risk of war as they have avoided regional cooperation for too long. The report provides examples of successful cooperation, which can be used by countries in the Middle East.

Jordan has little water, and dams in Syria have reduced its available water sources over the years. Confronted by this lack of water, Jordan is preparing new techniques to use non-conventional water resources, such as second-hand use of irrigation water and desalinization techniques, which are very costly and are not yet used. A desalinization project will soon be started in Hisban, south of Amman. The Disi groundwater project, in the south of Jordan, will cost at least $250 million to bring out water. Along with the Al-Wehda Dam on the Yarmouk River, it is one of Jordan's largest strategic projects. The dam was first proposed in 1953 as part of the Johnston mission's Unified Plan; however, political differences between Israel and Jordan prevented construction from beginning until 2004. The dam is currently listed as a "Work in Progress" on the website of the Turkish contractor Ozaltin.

Under the 1994 Israel–Jordan peace treaty, Israel has agreed to provide  of water to Jordan annually. According to the treaty the two countries would cooperate in order to allow Jordan better access to water resources, notably through dams on the Yarmouk River.

The Golan Heights provide  of water per annum to Israel, which represents a third of its annual consumption. The Golan's water flows into the Sea of Galilee—Israel's largest reserve—which is then redistributed throughout the country by the National Water Carrier.

Water is an important issue in the Arab–Israeli conflict—indeed, according to former Israeli prime minister Ariel Sharon, it was one of the causes of the 1967 Six-Day War. In practice access to water has been a casus belli for Israel. Article 40 of the appendix B of the September 28, 1995 Oslo accords stated that "Israel recognizes Palestinians' rights on water in the West Bank".

Israel obtains water from four sources: rainwater that flows naturally into the Sea of Galilee and the Jordan River (c. 36%), the mountain aquifers (c. 28%), the coastal aquifer (c. 14%), and water recycling (c. 23%). Almost all the water used in the Palestinian areas other than rainwater is drawn from the underground aquifers (mountain aquifer c. 52%, coastal aquifer c. 48%). The Palestinian Authority has not developed any significant wastewater treatment facilities. The mountain aquifers lie mostly under the West Bank and the coastal aquifer mostly under the Israeli coastal plain. Israel took control of the West Bank in 1967, including the recharge areas for aquifers that flow west and northwest into Israel and limits were placed on the amount withdrawn from each existing well. Currently, a total of 150 million cubic meters per year is consumed by its residents—115 million cubic meters per year by Palestinians and 35 million cubic meters per year by Israelis. Water usage issues have been part of a number of agreements reached between Israel and the Palestinian Authority. For these reasons, the question of water supply for both Israel and a potential future state of Palestine is a very serious issue in a comprehensive agreement.

Egypt 

The dispute between Egypt and Ethiopia over the $4.5 billion Grand Ethiopian Renaissance Dam — Africa's largest, with a reservoir about the size of London – has become a national preoccupation in both countries. Egypt has opposed the dam, fearing that it will reduce the amount of water it receives from the Nile.

South America 
The Guaraní Aquifer, located between the Mercosur countries of Argentina, Brazil, Paraguay and Uruguay, with a volume of about 40,000 km3, is an important source of fresh potable water for all four countries. It is replenished by water from rains and small rivers and streams, mainly on its margins. As populational growth in its area is still relatively high (the feeder areas of the aquifer, especially the wettest ones, may locate even important and big metropolitan areas such as São Paulo and Curitiba), monitoring is required to avoid deplenishing, and pollution, that would be associated with the still very weak environmental legislation concerning farming and with the still low performance of the coverage of sanitation (mainly in the form of discharge of untreated sewage and exposed untreated garbage, including urban, what potentializes problems associated with flooding), in the countries affected.

United States 
The Water Justice movement is a largely grassroots US movement, with small groups of citizens taking the issue into their own hands by means of protesting, petitioning, fundraising, or donating items such as water filters in order to broaden access to clean water. Some well-known people have used their exposure to further the cause of water justice: Erin Brockovich, media personality and environmental activist has spoken against Flint officials' mishandling of the water crisis there. Actress Shailene Woodley was arrested at a Dakota Access Pipeline protest, writing afterwards about her experience: "If you are a human who requires water to survive, then this issue directly involves you."

Another key player arguing to defend access to clean water in the Standing Rock protests is the Standing Rock Sioux Tribal Chairman, Dave Archambault II, who has spoken to the Human Rights Council at the U.N. in Geneva on behalf of his tribe. In a separate statement, Archambault thanked those who fought the pipeline "in the name of protecting our water."

The Water Justice movement has also moved globally, encompassing a wide array of diverse groups such as the Global Water Justice Movement, Friends of the Right to Water, the Centre on Housing Rights and Evictions, Food and Water Watch, and the Heinrich Böll Foundation. Groups such as these believe that water is part of the global commons, and thus argue against the privatization of water resources and give the state the responsibility of ensuring the right to water.

Legal acts
To prevent increased pollution, environmental damage, and to keep drinking water clean, various Legal acts have been signed into law.
 The Clean Water Act: The Clean Water Act was signed into law in 1948 under the name Federal Water Pollution Control Act, with expanded recognition and amendments in 1972. Amendments included:
 Outlawing of any pollutant being released anywhere that would lead to large bodies of water.
 Regulation of pollutants entering bodies of water.
 Provided funding for sewage treatment plants.
 Empowered the EPA with the authority to enforce water regulation rules.
 The Ocean Dumping Act: The Ocean Dumping Act was signed into law in 1972 to prevent excess pollution from entering the ocean. The EPA has the authority to fine no more than $50,000 for each breach of permit. The act also allows for general research and EPA research into ridding the ocean of pollutant dumping.
 Shore Protection Act (SPA): The Shore Protection Act comes from title IV of the Ocean Dumping Act. It forbids vessels from carrying waste within coastal waters without a permit.
 Right To Water: Also known as the Human Right to Water and Sanitation, it was established by the United Nations on July 28, 2010. It was added to international law when the UN recognized water and general sanitation as a basic human right. It requires states and nations to provide clean, accessible drinking water to their people.
 Safe Drinking Water Act (SDWA): The Safe Drinking Water Act was put into law in 1974. It provides protection to water both above and below ground. In 1996, amendments were added requiring the EPA to assess risks and costs when creating standards for this law.

Activism 
When it comes to America alone, there has been much activity surrounding the issues of water in Standing Rock, ND and Flint, Michigan. When the issue arose of a pipeline being implemented on the Standing Rock Indian Reservation of North Dakota, residents began to take action almost immediately. When the pipeline was proposed in January 2016, the Sioux tribe released a petition that garnered almost half a million signatures within 3 months. This postponed the construction of the pipeline, but the action did not stop there. In July of the same year, the tribe attempted to sue the Army Corps of Engineers with the argument that it would harm the area's water supply. This only led the Energy Transfer Partners to file a counter lawsuit, saying that the group was hindering their work. 2016 presidential candidate  Jill Stein led movements against the construction, which included spray painting  a bulldozer with the phrase, "I approve this message". Adding to the publication of the issue, actress Shailene Woodley was arrested for blocking the construction of the pipeline. The debate on whether or not the pipeline will actually be built is still in progress.

The water crisis in Flint, Michigan has also led activists to focus on getting clean water to the people. After the 2014 decision to make the Flint River the primary water source of the town, residents quickly noticed the quality of their water declining. The American Civil Liberties Union filed multiple lawsuits against the administration in Flint, saying that the levels of lead in the water is absurd, and demanded the pipes be replaced. This has yet to happen, and the people of Flint continue to struggle for clean water.

Related organizations and programs
Several state and national organizations and programs are dedicated to the access of safe water. The scope of these organizations are varied by their outreach (from focusing on a small county to working globally) and the aspects of water justice they are contributing to. Many of these organizations work within governmental systems while others work outside of them. These organizations have helped aid in the understanding and knowledge of water related issues, how they affect individuals and communities, and have found solutions to improve safe water access.

Categories of water justice organizations and programs include:
Education: The United States of America has some of the safest drinking water supplies in the world. Despite this, there are several cases and outbreaks of illnesses and related health issues due to contaminated water reported to the Centers for Disease Control and Prevention every year. Several organizations work to educate communities about proper water safety procedures and places emphasis on individuals and communities to understand where their water supply comes from.
Industry: Many water justice organizations work within industries related to community water to create safer water infrastructure. Many provide certification to certain professions to ensure work and product quality related to water. Additionally, many organizations have created groups for professions that deal with water infrastructure and safety. Some of these profession include public health professionals, engineers, and scientific researchers.
Research: Several of these organizations also promote environmental and public health related research and aid in funding and education of these projects.
Governmental:Many organizations related to water justice work with or within the government to enact change in water policy and management. This can include city and state governments, to the federal government, to Tribal governments.

Case studies: Africa 
Obuasi, Ghana is the home of one of the world's top gold mining sites. It was in 1897 when the first machinery was used to mine the gold from the region. As the years went by, new strategies were needed to establish out ways to "treat the ores". By 1908, A leading chemist was brought in to help with the strategies and brought his Australian method of "dry crushing and roasting preparatory to treatment with cyanide". Many rivers, fishing areas, and irrigation systems have been either slightly or permanently damaged. The mining industry has tried to compensate by building standpipes but for many, they have been to no use. The average amount of contamination in the water system of Obuasi was over 10–38 times the maximum amount that is allowable by law. The two main sources of the contamination is the arsenic powder that flows out from the mills and the extensive amount of run-off water that is disposed of through dams. "Thus in the processing of the ore for gold, the dust may contain particles of the ore, ferric oxide, oxides of arsenic and sulphur". The dust will then get carried into the atmosphere and settle on the soil, humans, and rivers. In Obuasi, they receive a high annual rainfall due to the tropical rainforest that surrounds it (Smedley, 1996, 464). During precipitation or rainfall, the dust "may be oxidized to the trioxide by the air and be converted to the sulphate in dew and rainwater". The soil is the main target of contamination because the soil is contaminated and whatever vegetation grows and decays goes right back in the soil which results in the contamination of the groundwater. However, the groundwater is not as polluted as the streams or rivers mainly due to the high dissolving process of the arsenic and due to the basement rocks that lie between the groundwater and the soil. "The only disadvantage is that whatever is deposited on the surface soil may be carried to greater depths with time by rainwater (Gish et al, 2010, 1973)". The most extensively damaged areas are the ones closest to the mines, but with the wind carrying the dust, areas hundreds of miles away are getting contaminated by the chemicals. Due to the extensive output of the chemicals from the mining mills and un resolved toxic spills, many rivers, streams, lakes and irrigation systems have been damaged or obsolete. The local residents have been affected greatly by this phenomenon. Residents have seen the environmental changes especially in the water. Sludge floats down on streams that were once main sources of drinking water according to local residents. All the marine life in the rivers and streams has died due to the high amounts of chemicals in the water. According to Action Aid, residents have seen pipes that run straight into local streams and rivers that were depositing the waste directly sometimes causing flooding of the streams and rivers (2006, 11). Many local farmers suffered the hardest with the contamination of the water. Due to the irrigation systems using the contaminated water to irrigate all of the soil were then contaminated as well. The soil was no longer usable, causing the killing off their crops that were used for their business as well as for their own families. Children have also been targeted and affected by the pollution. According to Action Aid, many schools have been flooded with the over flow of the local streams, causing the children to leave school, sometimes permanently. AngloGold Ashanti (AGA) has put up standpipes to compensate for the contaminated water supplies, but these have also been useless to the locals. Standpipes were installed in the 1940s and 50's that have now been contaminated with arsenic from the mills. AGA staff claim it is because of them being made of iron, but studies have shown large amounts of arsenic in the water. Many standpipes have been either broken or obsolete. This leads to the residents to walk at least 1.5 miles to go get clean water. All the work the local people have to go through to get clean water is uncalled for. No compensation has been giving to the local residents for the damage they have done to their water and environment.

Economy

Global economy 
Globalization has benefitted the economy greatly through increased trade and production of food, energy, and goods. However, the increase of trade and production of goods requires large quantities of water, in fact the OECD countries predict that by 2050, the global demand for water will increase by 55%. Multiple countries and organizations have declared a water crisis. Water is a finite resource that is shared between nations, within nations, multiple interest groups and private organizations. Roughly 50% of all water available is located between two or more nation states. Water politics and management requires efficient water allocation through policies and cooperation between nations. Poor water politics and practices can result in water conflict, which is more common surrounding freshwater due to its necessity for survival. Countries that have a greater supply of water have greater economic success due to an increase in agricultural business and the production of goods, whereas countries, which have limited access to water, have less economic success. This gap in economic success due to water availability can also result in water conflict. The World Trade Organization has emerged as a key figure in the allocation of water in order to protect the agricultural trade.  Water is an essential commodity in the global market for economic success.

Jordan River 

The Jordan River conflict, otherwise known as the War over Water is an example of transboundary conflict between Israel, Jordan, Lebanon and Palestine. This water conflict begun in 1953 as a result of poor water politics and management between nation states and negotiations are ongoing. The conflict begun with Jordan's intention to irrigate land using a shared basin for agriculture and economic purposes, in response, Israel closed the gates of a dam in the Sea of Galilee, draining the water available. Negotiations started with the Bunger Plan that would allocate water from the Jordan River fairly among the surrounding nations, however Israel declared its riparian rights were not recognized. The consequences of the Jordan River conflict has resulted in economic damages to irrigation, agriculture, production, and resources to all of the nation states involved. The World Health Organization records that the total global economic loss associated with inadequate water politics, supply and sanitation is estimated at $260 billion annually USD. The Jordan River conflict demonstrates a lack of efficient transboundary water politics, which has contributed to this annual global economic loss. Currently, negotiations have attempted to establish a fair divide and share of the Jordan River, but have had little success.

Aral Sea 

The water conflict in the Aral Sea is an ongoing transboundary conflict starting from 1991 between Kazakhstan, Kyrgyzstan, Turkmenistan, Tajikistan and Uzbekistan. Social causes such as economic development, population growth, electricity demand, and pollution has resulted in water scarcity. The water scarcity has resulted in limited availability to allocate water efficiently between the neighboring countries. The water scarcity has impacted many aspects of life and resources such as; fish, biodiversity, water, air pollution, forestry, agricultural land and ecosystem availability. The impact of poor water politics and management has negatively influenced the economy of the surrounding countries and has created stress on resources that are crucial to the agricultural sector. Research indicates that water scarcity can cost regions up to 6% of their GDP and cause migration, which negatively impacts the local economy. There have been multiple attempts to resolve the conflict from different organizations such as The Interstate Commission for Water Coordination, Interstate Council of the Aral Sea, and The Aral Sea Basin Program, but the issue is still ongoing.

Local economy 
Water politics is present within nations, otherwise known as subnational. The shared jurisdiction of access to water between intergovernmental actors is crucial to efficient water politics. Inefficient water politics at the subnational level has a greater impact on the local economy through increased costs for businesses, increased costs for the agricultural sector, decreased local competitiveness, decrease in local jobs and infrastructure costs. For instance, Texas plans to build reservoirs to combat water shortages; these reservoirs will cost more than $600 per acre-foot for construction. Subnational states have a crucial role in water politics through managing local water sources and addressing issues concerning water politics such as allocation, scarcity and water pollution.

Colorado River basin 

The Colorado River basin is transboundary basin shared between the United States and Mexico. However at the subnational level within United States, the basin is shared between Colorado, Utah, Arizona, Nevada and California. The Colorado River Basin demonstrates intergovernmental conflict over the autonomy of water politics. Intergovernmental water politics has many actors such as private organizations and interest groups. Cooperation in subnational water politics can result in economic benefits through shared costs and risk for infrastructure. In addition, efficient water politic management results in profitable allocations of water that can sustain irrigation and the agricultural sector.

Human Rights 

Water is an absolute necessity in human sustainability and human survival. There is no human activity that can be sustained without the use of water whether it be at a direct or indirect level. The United Nations declared access to water as a fundamental basic human right under articles 11 and 12 of the International Covenant, which identifies and protects rights at an international level. In addition, the Millennium Development Goals of 2000 includes the sharing and fair allocation of water as a major goal. The United Nations and Millennium Development Goals oppose water privatization because water is a human right and every human being is entitled to water use. Equal access to water entails that no individual should be given privilege over the other at the absolute basic level. The sale of water cannot be permitted or justified under the United Nations at the basic level because water is seen as a universal human right. The right to water was created specifically to assist poor individuals in developing countries through attaining equitable access to water to prevent illness and death. Additionally, water rights are also associated with protecting the environment, strengthening the economy and strengthening the water delivery system.

There have been many agreements set in place to try and avoid inequality and conflict with the use of water. Still, international leaders are struggling with incorporating bilateral and multilateral agreements to ensure efficient and fair water allocation. For instance, there are approximately 275 river basins and 270 ground water aquifers with policies that manage the sharing of the resource by two or more nations. Despite the use of policies in the shared management of water, there have been multiple conflicts between nations because of poor water allocation. Likewise, there has been over 300 water treaties signed internationally in dealing with water sharing yet the management and allocation of water is still unresolved. Currently, policies and agreements intended to address water politics and allocation between nation states are insufficient. The United Nations has not presented an initiative to create a strategic framework to penalize nations, which have water conflicts. Without enforcement of such policies and frameworks nations feel minimal pressure in complying with policies, resulting in continued inefficient practice of water politics. There has been a demand from countries and interest groups for the United Nations to set out a policy with rules and boundaries on water sharing and allocation. This policy must include clear-cut penalties for countries that go against the policies.

As the availability of water decreases daily, the demand for policies and agreements to address water allocation and sharing increases. Bilateral and multilateral agreements are most important for third world countries since water is a scarce resource, and they will be the first to face water shortages. The purpose of agreements is to ensure that all individuals have access to water as part of their fundamental basic human rights. Developed countries can offer resources to trade for water but third world countries are not as well off as developed countries and will lag behind. If agreements are not set in place many third world countries will have no choice but to turn to warfare in order to secure water. Water wars can arise over the necessity of water for survival; a lack of water can result in economic consequences, biodiversity consequences, environmental consequences, illness and even death. The United Nations emphasizes and prioritizes water as a human right. However, the United Nations fails to create a policy that appropriately creates balance in terms of water-sharing and allocation.

Hydropsychology 
The creation of policies and agreements becomes even more difficult when the matter of hydropsychology is factored in. Hydropsychology is known as the use of water at the micro-level or at the individual level. Hydropsychology is advantageous because it studies the use of water at the smaller scale. Hydropsychology is noted as the bottom-up approach whereas hydropolitics (water politics) is the top-down approach. Historically, hydropsychology was not given much attention because international leaders focused on international water sharing and allocation rather than domestic use. Currently, international leaders are now requesting urgent and increased attention from the international community on the matter of hydropsychology because it greatly impacts water scarcity. For example, the United States has a large abundance of water; as a result the United States micro-level management of water provides the ability for the United States to have recreational activities such as water parks that provides economic advantages. Whereas, many third world countries do not have access to clean water and their situation will only worsen as the water supply lessens. Hydropsychology is important because it determines how much of the world's water supply is being used at the micro-level. Furthermore, the usage of water for recreational activity instead of sustainability creates a significant increase in the attention that hydropsychology is now receiving as there are drastic gaps between the availability of water in countries. Some countries use water freely for recreation, whereas other countries had limited supplies for survival, efficient water politics addresses this issue through good water allocation and management. Hydropsychology indicates that the interest of certain individuals and communities in certain countries takes precedence over the importance of equality and water as a human right. However countries can utilize resources however they please, international agreements exist to avoid water conflict between nations through efficient water allocation practices.

There has been a proposition in a more balanced approach for water-sharing and allocation through a combination of large scale politics on the international level and smaller scale politics (hydropsychology) rather than focusing strictly one a singular approach. This balanced approach would include policies created at community levels and national levels in order to address the issue of water-sharing and allocation. Currently, hydropolitics only studies water at the international level and hydropsychology studies water at local level. The failure of hydropolitics on its own is demonstrated through the conflicts that have occurred in the past and present between nations that share and manage water together. Thus the combination of hydropolitics and hydropsychology would assist international leaders with addressing water-sharing. Both hydropolitics and hydropsychology have different approaches on dealing with the matter and the different ideas can merge to create a more complete solution. The combination of hydropsychology and hydropolitics will also assist in dealing with matters such as virtual water trading, river linking scheme, large dams, and climate change. The advantage is based on the premise that the use of water starts at the individual level, which eventually impacts the actions of governments and major institutions. The international level pays minimal attention to local affairs but has extensive knowledge on international policies. Subsequently, the local level pays minimal attention to international affairs but has major knowledge on local water use. Thus, the combination of the two make up for the lack of attention each level gives to the other. It is also important to note that the individual level has an impact on the governmental level, which affects the abundance of water, and international agreements that will be created. The reconciliation of hydropolitics and hydropsychology must be considered in dealing with water-sharing. The importance of hydropsychology was neglected in the past but its importance is extremely evident for the present and future.

Privatization 
Privatization of water companies has been contested on several occasions because of poor water quality, increasing prices, and ethical concerns. In Bolivia for example, the proposed privatization of water companies by the International Monetary Fund was met by popular protests in Cochabamba in 2000, which ousted Bechtel, a US engineering firm based in San Francisco. Suez has started retreating from South America because of similar protests in Buenos Aires, Santa Fe, and Córdoba, Argentina. Consumers took to the streets to protest water rate hikes of as much as 500% mandated by Suez. In South and Central America, Suez has water concessions in Argentina, Bolivia, Brazil and Mexico. "Bolivian officials fault Suez for not connecting enough households to water lines as mandated by its contract and for charging as much as $455 a connection, or about three times the average monthly salary of an office clerk", according to The Mercury News.

South Africa also made moves to privatize water, provoking an outbreak of cholera that killed 200.

In 1997, World Bank consultants assisted the Philippine government in the privatization of the city of Manila's Metropolitan Waterworks and Sewerage Systems (MWSS). By 2003, water price increases registered at 81% in the east zone of the Philippines and 36% in the west region. As services became more expensive and inefficient under privatization, there was reduced access to water for poor households. In October 2003, the Freedom from Debt Coalition reported that the diminished access to clean water resulted in an outbreak of cholera and other gastrointestinal diseases.

Water privatization is a strategy utilized to deliver a secure and sustainable supply of water from private organizations rather than having the public sector provide this service. Privatization of water politics entails a reorganization of water allocation from the public sector to the private sector through privatization and commercialization of water. The government forfeits the management of water politics to a private organization. Private organizations allocate water based on capitalism mechanisms. The commercialization of water politics in the private sector distributes water based on rationales that concern economic profitability.

Historically, water privatization has resulted in civil disputes, protests and wars. The United Nations classifies access to clean drinking water as a universal human right.

Mexico City 

Water privatization has been adopted in Mexico City to combat the growing concern of poor water politics offered by the public sector. Under the public sector, it was estimated that Mexico City lost up to 40% of its water through leaky pipes. In 1994, Mexico City privatized its water services through the Distrito Federal to tackle water shortages. The environmental and economic scenario at the time pressured the Party of the Democratic Revolution to adapt water privatization in order to address water shortages. Mexico City is one of few examples of a successful privatization of water services. From 1994 to 2003 multinational water corporations provided an increase of water quality services, while the public sector held control of infrastructure. However, recently Mexico City has faced some hardships in water privatization due to contract negotiations between the public and private sector, which has resulted in stalled efficiency of water services.

Bolivia 

Bolivia privatized its water supply in the city of Cochabamba in 1999 to Sempa, a multinational private water organization. Afterwards, Bolivia signed a $2.5 billion contract, behind closed doors for Cochabamba's water system to Aguas del Tunari. The privatization of Cochabamba's water supply resulted in The Cochabamba Water War, which started in 1999 and concluded in 2000. The Cochabamba Water War resulted in multiple protests and violent outbreaks in response to the privatization of water. Aguas del Tunari promised to provide electricity and irrigation to Cochabamba. In addition, Bechtel, a major shareholder of Aguas del Tunari, ensured that water and sewage services would increase dramatically under private management. However, Cochabamba citizens were told that these services would result in a 35% increase in costs for water. The Bolivian government enacted Law 2029 which provided a regime of concessions regarding the provision of water, Law 2029 essentially gave the private sector the water monopoly and exclusive rights to water within Cochabamba. The goal of law 2029 was to provide more efficient water services to areas in Cochabamba that had a population over 10,000 citizens through water privatization. The situation in Cochabamba was exacerbated when the cost of water doubled, and even tripled in certain areas. The rise in costs was due to the construction of the Misicuni dam project and the debt left behind by Sempa. The drastic increase in cost for water supply resulted in protests that shut down the city for four days. Peaceful protests lead by Oscar Olivera quickly became violent causing multiple protests that lasted days resulting in the Bolivian government declaring a state of emergency  The Cochabamba water war concludes with President Huge Banzer resigning from office, leaving Bolivia in similar conditions before the privatization of water

See also 

 Drainage law
 Water management
 Water exports
 International waters, Territorial waters, Internal waters
 Hydropolitics in the Nile Basin
 Mekong River Commission
 Water scarcity in Africa
 Water supply terrorism
US:
 United States groundwater law
 Clean Water Protection Act
 Highlands Water Protection and Planning Act
 California Water Wars
 Colorado River Compact
 Ogallala Aquifer
 Navajo Indian Irrigation Project

References

Bibliography 

.
Serageldin, I.  "Water: conflicts set to arise within as well as between states", Nature, Vol. 459, p. 163. 2009.
Rahaman, M. M. (Editor) in need Issue:  Water Wars in 21st Century along International Rivers Basins: Speculation or Reality?, International Journal of Sustainable Society, Vol. 4, Nos. 1/2, 193 pages. 2012
 Copeland, Claudia. Ocean Dumping Act: A Summary of the Law. Washington, D.C.: Congressional Research Service, Library of Congress, 1999. National Oceanic and Atmosphere Administration. Congressional Research Service, 15 December 2015. Retrieved 2 March 2017.
 "Drinking Water National and State Organizations and Programs". Drinking Water National and State Organizations and Programs. National Environmental Services Center, 2013. Retrieved 2 March 2017.
 "Drinking Water Safety". Centers for Disease Control and Prevention. Centers for Disease Control and Prevention, 19 May 2014. Retrieved 2 March 2017.
 "History of the Clean Water Act". EPA. Environmental Protection Agency, 25 May 2016. Retrieved 2 March 2017.
 "HRW, Decade, Water for Life, 2015, UN-Water, United Nations, MDG, Water, Sanitation, Financing, Gender, IWRM, Human Right, Transboundary, Cities, Quality, Food Security, General Comment, BKM, Albuquerque". United Nations, July 2010. Retrieved 2 March. 2017.
 "Human Health and Contaminated Water". EPA. Environmental Protection Agency, 7 June 2016. Retrieved 2 March 2017.
 Perlman, Howard. "Contaminants Found in Groundwater". Contaminants Found in Groundwater, USGS Water Science School. The USGS Water Science School, 2 December 2016. Retrieved 2 March 2017.
 "Summary of the Shore Protection Act". EPA. Environmental Protection Agency, 30 December 2016. Retrieved 2 March 2017.
 "Summary of the Safe Drinking Water Act". EPA. Environmental Protection Agency, 7 February 2017. Retrieved 2 March 2017.
 "Tribal Climate Change Guide". National Tribal Environmental Council. University of Oregon, 20 October 2015. Retrieved 2 March 2017.
 US Department of Commerce, National Oceanic and Atmospheric Administration. "Nonpoint Source Pollution". NOAA's National Ocean Service Education. U.S. Department of Commerce, 19 December 2004. Retrieved 2 March 2017.
 "Water Contamination". Centers for Disease Control and Prevention. Centers for Disease Control and Prevention, 11 October 2016. Retrieved 2 March 2017.

External links

ISARM Internationally Shared Aquifer Resources Management
Water Wars Multimedia on water scarcity and hydropolitics in East Africa
Israel Ministry of the Environment
Israel's Chronic Water Problem